The Rai, or sometimes pronounced as Rain, Raeen or Rayeen is a Hindu caste found in the state of Haryana and Punjab in India. They are also known as Chaudhary, Rao, Rai and Rana.

Origin 
According to their own traditions, the community were Hindus of Sindh, who were expelled by Umayyad general Muhammad bin Qasim during Muslim conquests on the Indian subcontinent. They also claim a connection with the last Hindu Rajput ruler Raja Rai Sahasi II of Rai dynasty (c. 416–644 CE) of the Sindh who was the brother of Rana Maharath/Malhot a Rajput king of Chittor. The community is now found mainly in Haryana, Punjab, Rajasthan & Uttar Pradesh.

Present circumstances 

They were and still zamindars & farmers. A few were substantial landowners, with a small minority being landless. They practice animal husbandry as a secondary occupation, and they provide much of the dairy products for the towns in Haryana.

References 

Social groups of Haryana
Indian castes